Latin American Muslims are Muslims from countries in Latin America. A survey conducted by the Pew Research Center in 2010 found that Muslims make up 0.1% of all of Latin America's population.

History 
The history of Muslims in South America is disputed.

Some believe that the first Muslims that came in Latin America came under Portuguese and Spanish armies, However some claim that Muslims were the first to reach America than the Europeans.

Statistics 

Quoted from "Muslims in Latin America" by Muhammad Yusuf Hallar - "According to statistics, the number of muslims in Latin America is over four million, serving as an example 700,000 (seven hundred thousand) in Argentina and more than 1,500,000 (one point five million) in Brazil." Based on other estimates the Muslims in the area of Latin America are 100,000 mainly concentrated in Brazil, El Salvador and Argentina but also there are concentrations in Venezuela, Colombia and Paraguay. Most of these Latin American Muslims are from either Lebanese, Syrian and some convert origin. 

A survey conducted by the Pew Research Center in 2010 found that the number of muslims in Latin America and Caribbean is around 840,000. According to the International Religious Freedom Report in 2015, the actual size of Argentina's Muslim community is estimated to be around 1% of the total population (400,000 to 500,000 members). And according to the 2010 census, the number of Muslims in Brazil, was 35,207 out of a population of approximately 191 million people.

Suriname has the highest percentage of Muslims in its population for the region, with 13.9% or 75,053	individuals, according to its 2012 census. Islam came to Suriname with immigrants from Indonesia (Java) and South Asia (today India, Pakistan and Bangladesh).

Organizations 

Many Muslim organizations exist in Latin America, such as the Islamic Organization of Latin America (OIPAL). OIPAL is considered the most active organization in Latin America in promoting Islamic affiliated endeavors.

See also 

Islam in Argentina
Islam in Bolivia
Islam in Brazil
Islam in Chile
Islam in Colombia
Islam in Ecuador
Islam in Haiti
Islam in Panama
Islam in Paraguay
Islam in Peru
Islam in Uruguay
Islam in Venezuela
Islam in Belize
Islam in Costa Rica
Islam in Cuba
Islam in Guatemala
Islam in Dominican Republic
Islam in El Salvador
Islam in Honduras
Islam in Mexico
Islam in Nicaragua
Islam in Puerto Rico
Islam in Suriname
Islam in Guyana
Latino Muslims
IOLA

References

External links
IOLA Website

Latin American studies
Islam in South America
Islam in Central America